Diego Novelli (born 22 May 1931 in Turin) is an Italian politician, former Mayor of Turin.

Political career
A member of the city council of Turin since 1960, Novelli was elected Mayor of Turin in 1975 with the support of communists and socialists, and remained in office for 10 years, during the difficult Years of Lead.

He was a Member of the European Parliament from 1984 to 1987, when he was elected to the Chamber of Deputies. He remained a member until 2001.

With the Svolta della Bolognina and the end of the Italian Communist Party, he co-founded with Leoluca Orlando the left-wing party The Network and tried to be re-elected Mayor of Turin in 1993, supported by The Network and the Communist Refoundation Party. Although he was ahead on the first round, he was defeated on the second ballot by the centre-left candidate Valentino Castellani.

In 2009, he stood in the European elections with Left Ecology and Freedom, but failed to be elected.

In 2011, he was elected president of the provincial committee of ANPI.

References

External links
Files about his parliamentary activities (in Italian): X, XI, XII, XIII legislature

1931 births
Living people
Deputies of Legislature X of Italy
Deputies of Legislature XI of Italy
Deputies of Legislature XII of Italy
Deputies of Legislature XIII of Italy
Mayors of Turin
Italian Communist Party politicians
Turin communal councillors
Politicians from Turin